This is a list of Panjabi films of 2007.

List of films

External links 
 Punjabi films at the Internet Movie Database

2007
Punjabi